McElroy is an Irish surname originating in County Fermanagh, Ireland, where the placename Ballymackilroy is found

McElroy is the surname of a number of people:

Family of Clint McElroy 
 Clint McElroy (born 1955), American radio personality, comics writer and podcaster
 Griffin McElroy (born 1987), American video games journalist and podcaster; son of Clint
 Justin McElroy (born 1980), American podcaster and writer; son of Clint
 Sydnee McElroy, American doctor, podcaster; wife of Justin
 Travis McElroy (born 1983), American podcaster; son of Clint

Other notable people with the surname 
 Alan B. McElroy, American writer
 Albert McElroy (1915–1975), Northern Irish politician
 Brennan McElroy (born 1912), American basketball player
 Caralee McElroy (born 1983), American multi-instrumentalist
 Chuck McElroy (born 1967), American baseball player
 Codey McElroy (born 1992), American football player
 Colleen J. McElroy (born 1935), American writer
 Drake McElroy (born 1969), American motorcycle racer
 Edward J. McElroy, labor leader
 George McElroy (1893–1918), Irish World War I Flying Ace
 George McElroy (journalist) (born 1922–2006), journalist
 Greg McElroy, American former professional football player
 Guy McElroy (born 1946–1990), Scholar of African-American art
 Ian McElroy, American musician
 Immanuel McElroy (born 1980), American basketball player
 James McElroy (1945–2011), Irish American mobster
 Jane Roma McElroy (born 1867–1923), American painter
 Jim McElroy (born 1953), American basketball player
 Jim McElroy (baseball) (born 1862–1889), Major League Baseball player
 John McElroy (Jesuit) (1782–1877), one of two of the Army's first Catholic Chaplains. Founder of St. John's Literary Institute, Boston College High School, and Boston College.
 John McElroy (author) (1846–1929), American soldier, journalist and author
 Joseph McElroy (born 1930), American novelist
 Ken McElroy (1934–1981), American murder victim and criminal
 Leeland McElroy (born 1974), All-American college football player, professional football player, kick returner
 Lillian McElroy (born 1917–2009), American politician
 Lilly McElroy, American photographer and artist
 Mark McElroy (Ohio politician) (1906–1981), American politician
 Mark McElroy (Arkansas politician), American politician
 Mary Arthur McElroy (1841–1917), sister of U.S. President Chester A. Arthur and acting First Lady
 Michael McElroy (actor), musical theatre actor
 Michael McElroy (scientist), atmosphere scientist
 Neil H. McElroy (1904–1972), American Secretary of Defense
 Reggie McElroy (born 1960), American football player
 Robert McNutt McElroy (1872–1959), professor at Princeton University
 Robert W. McElroy (born 1954), Catholic bishop of San Diego
 Roy McElroy (1907–1994), Mayor of Auckland, New Zealand (1965–1968)
 Sam McElroy (born c. 1963), American football coach
 Steven McElroy (born 1966), American actor and director
 Theodore Roosevelt McElroy (born 1901–1963), American telegrapher operator
 Tony McElroy, British spin doctor
 Vann McElroy (born 1960), American football player
 Wendy McElroy, Canadian author
 William D. McElroy (1917–1999), American biochemist
 William S. McEllroy, American tennis player

Fictional characters
 Chef (South Park), whose full name is Jerome McElroy
 Stuart McElroy, fictional character from the BBC drama Holby City.

See also
 Elroy (disambiguation)
 McIlroy

References

Surnames of Irish origin
Anglicised Irish-language surnames